The Richmond County Daily Journal is an American, English language newspaper published in Rockingham, Richmond County, North Carolina.  The paper is published bi-weekly, on Wednesday and Saturday.  The predecessor of this paper is the Richmond County Journal (1931–1966).  The newspaper is a member of the North Carolina Press Association.

See also
 List of newspapers in North Carolina

References

Daily newspapers published in North Carolina
Richmond County, North Carolina